Darrell "D. J." Bryant (born March 3, 1989) is a former American football outside linebacker. He played college football at James Madison.

Early years
He attended Randallstown High School in Randallstown, Maryland. He was Most Valuable Player of the Baltimore City-County All-Star game. He also was a two-time All-County defensive end and wide receiver at Randallstown High School.

College career
He was selected to the preseason Second-team All-CAA by Phil Steele in his sophomore season. In his Senior season, he was named First-team All-CAA as a defensive lineman.

Professional career

Houston Texans
On April 29, 2012, he signed with Houston Texans as an undrafted free agent. On August 31, 2012, he was released by the Texans.

Tampa Bay Buccaneers
On September 18, 2012, he signed with the Tampa Bay Buccaneers to join the practice squad.

Indianapolis Colts
On October 9, 2012, he signed with the Indianapolis Colts to join their practice squad.

New York Jets
On November 5, 2012, he signed with the New York Jets to join their practice squad. On December 4, 2012, he was released from the practice squad.

Baltimore Ravens
On December 13, 2012, he signed with the Baltimore Ravens to join their practice squad. On December 19, he was released from the practice squad. On December 26, he was re-signed to join the practice squad.

References

External links
James Madison bio
Houston Texans bio
Baltimore Ravens bio

1989 births
Living people
American football linebackers
Baltimore Ravens players
Edmonton Elks players
Houston Texans players
Indianapolis Colts players
James Madison Dukes football players
New York Jets players
People from Randallstown, Maryland
Players of American football from Baltimore
Sportspeople from Baltimore County, Maryland
Tampa Bay Buccaneers players